Nivaldo Lourenço da Silva (born 28 September 1975), known simply as Nivaldo, is a former Brazilian football player.

Club statistics

References

External links

jsgoal

1975 births
Living people
Brazilian footballers
Brazilian expatriate footballers
Expatriate footballers in Japan
J2 League players
Montedio Yamagata players
Shonan Bellmare players

Association football midfielders
Sportspeople from Paraná (state)